Li Hua March 6, 1907 − May 5, 1994), was a Chinese woodcut artist and communist known for his participation in left-wing activities, was born in Panyu, Guangdong.

Career
He graduated from the Municipal Guangzhou Art School in 1926 and remained there as a teacher.

Li returned to Guangzhou in 1932, after the Mukden Incident broke out, and served once again as a teacher at the art school where he had studied. At that time, he began to learn woodcutting art. He was influenced by Lu Xun who regarded him as one of the most promising woodcut artists of his generation. In June 1934, Li founded the Modern Woodcut Society at the Guangzhou Art School with an initial membership of 27. He produced many woodcuts to protest against the invasion by the Japanese army and the decaying government that was led by Chiang Kai-shek. One of Li's notable woodcut series was Raging Tide from 1947.

In 1949, he became a professor of the Central Academy of Fine Arts, and continued his artistic creations.

Despite Li not officially joining the Communist Party of China until 1953, his work had been associated with the leftist cause for many years. Li died in Beijing at the Peking Union Medical Hospital in 1994.

Selected publications

References

Further reading

External links
Modern Chinese Woodblock Prints & Revolutionary Art
Fleeing Refugees (1944), Li Hua
Struggle (c. 1946), Li Hua print from his Raging Tide series
Arise (c. 1947), Li Hua print from his Raging Tide series
Efforts to Accelerate the Four Modernizations 为加速实现四化而努力 (1958)

1907 births
1994 deaths
Chinese communists
Academic staff of the Central Academy of Fine Arts
People from Panyu District
Artists from Guangzhou
Chinese printmakers